The men's 3000 metres event  at the 1994 European Athletics Indoor Championships was held in Palais Omnisports de Paris-Bercy on 11 and 13 March.

Medalists

Results

Heats
First 3 from each heat (Q) and the next 6 fastest (q) qualified for the final.

Final

References

3000 metres at the European Athletics Indoor Championships
3000